RealDownloader is a freemium download manager by RealNetworks that downloads embedded Internet videos in multiple formats including MOV and FLV from sites such as YouTube, CollegeHumor, Facebook, Funny or Die and Dailymotion. This software utility lets users share downloaded videos on social networks and transfer them to their mobile devices. CNET reviewed it on July 19, 2011 and gave it a 4.5 / 5 rating.

Features
Features of the freeware version include:
 Automatic embedded video detection
Integration with web browsers such as Google Chrome, Internet Explorer and Mozilla Firefox
Downloads files in parallel
Integrated video viewing capabilities
 Built-in sharing to social networking sites like Twitter, Facebook and Myspace
Premium features include:
 Download, convert and copy files to a specific device
 Accelerated download
 Download audio only from a video file

References

Download managers
2011 software
Downloader